Order of Njegoš is an Order of the Republic of Srpska. It is established in 1993 by the Constitution of Republika Srpska and 'Law on orders and awards' valid since 28 April 1993.

It is named after Njegoš.

Ranks
Order of Njegoš is awarded for merits in education, culture and economy, and has three classes.

Notable recipients
 2018 -  Goran Dragić
 2018 -  Ivana Španović
 2012 -  Vojislav Koštunica

See also 
 Njegoš
 Orders, decorations and medals of Republika Srpska

References

Orders, decorations, and medals of Republic of Srpska
Awards established in 1993